Dushi district is located in the central part of Baghlan Province, Afghanistan. It lies on the major Kabul-Kunduz highway. The population of the district was estimated to be around 57,160 in 2004. Hazaras are around  60% of the population and make up the majority in the district, followed by Tajiks (39%). The centre of the district is Dushi. Dushi was considered contested between the Afghan Government and the Taliban in late 2018.

Geography 
Dushi has an area of 1942.5 square kilometers, comparatively equivalent to the area of Manus Island. The district has both the Kunduz River and the Andarab River running through the district. They meet near the town of Dushi. The district is located along the Kabul-Kunduz Highway, enabling the Taliban to collect duties.

Dushi is bordered by Puli Khumri District to the north, Nahrin District to the northeast, Andarab District and Khinjan District to the east, Tala wa Barfak District to the south, Ruyi Du Ab District to the west, and Dahana i Ghuri District to the north. Ruyi Du Ab is located in Samangan Province, with all other districts in Baghlan Province.

Electricity transmission 
Dushi is home to an overhead power line carrying imported electricity from Turkmenistan, Uzbekistan, and Uzbekistan. The 300 MegaWatt supply was the subject of a grant for expansion in 2013 from the Asian Development Bank. The line supplies several provinces and the capital, Kabul. On April 13, 2018, Taliban insurgents used explosives to destroy a pylon, disrupting power supplies to the region.

See also
Districts of Afghanistan

References

External links

Map of Settlements United Nations, AIMS, May 2002

Districts of Baghlan Province